Shurland David (born 19 August 1974) is a retired football defender and manager from Trinidad and Tobago.

Playing career 
David began his career in 1997 with Joe Public F.C., and later played in the TT Pro League with San Juan Jabloteh F.C. In 2001, he played abroad in the Canadian Professional Soccer League with Ottawa Wizards. Throughout his tenure with Ottawa he achieved a CPSL Championship, and a CPSL League Cup. In 2003, he returned to Trinidad to play with Caledonia AIA, and concluded his career with Starworld Strikers, and East/West Coaching School.

International career
He made his debut for the national team on January 4, 1998 against the Barbados national team in a friendly match, and made 44 appearances for the national team. He played in the 1998 CONCACAF Gold Cup, 1998 Caribbean Cup, and 2000 CONCACAF Gold Cup.

Managerial career  
In 2010, he was elevated from an assistant coach to interim head coach for North East Stars F.C. in order to replace Rod Underwood. In 2011, he was dismissed from his post after a series of poor results. In 2017, he managed in the National Super League with WASA F.C.

References

1974 births
Living people
Trinidad and Tobago footballers
Trinidad and Tobago international footballers
Joe Public F.C. players
South Starworld Strikers F.C. players
TT Pro League players
TT Pro League managers
Morvant Caledonia United players
San Juan Jabloteh F.C. players
Ottawa Wizards players
1998 CONCACAF Gold Cup players
2000 CONCACAF Gold Cup players
Association football defenders
Canadian Soccer League (1998–present) players
Trinidad and Tobago football managers
North East Stars F.C. managers
Trinidad and Tobago expatriate footballers
Trinidad and Tobago expatriate sportspeople in Canada
Expatriate soccer players in Canada